Romeu Pereira dos Santos (born 13 February 1985),  known as Romeu, is a Brazilian former professional footballer who last played as a defensive midfielder for Greek club Levadiakos.

Career statistics 
(correct as of 1 October 2013)

Honours

Club
Fluminense
Copa do Brasil: 2007

External links
 CBF
 sambafoot
 zerozero.pt

1985 births
Living people
Brazilian footballers
Brazilian expatriate footballers
Fluminense FC players
Athlitiki Enosi Larissa F.C. players
Levadiakos F.C. players
Panthrakikos F.C. players
Campeonato Brasileiro Série A players
Super League Greece players
Expatriate footballers in Greece
Sportspeople from Bahia
Association football midfielders